Ranjbaran may refer to:

 Laborers' Party of Iran (also known simply as Ranjbaran), Iranian political party
 Behzad Ranjbaran, Persian composer (born 1955)